Virginia's 12th Senate district is one of 40 districts in the Senate of Virginia. It has been represented by Republican Siobhan Dunnavant since 2016, succeeding retiring fellow Republican Walter Stosch.

Geography
District 12 is located in the immediate northern suburbs of Richmond, covering parts of Henrico and Hanover Counties.

The district overlaps with Virginia's 1st and 7th congressional districts, and with the 55th, 56th, 68th, 72nd, 73rd, and 74th districts of the Virginia House of Delegates.

Recent election results

2019

2015

2011

Federal and statewide results in District 12

Historical results
All election results below took place prior to 2011 redistricting, and thus were under different district lines.

2007

2003

1999

1995

References

Virginia Senate districts
Hanover County, Virginia
Government in Henrico County, Virginia